A bathroom or washroom is a room, typically in a home or other residential building, that contains either a bathtub or a shower (or both). The inclusion of a wash basin is common. In some parts of the world e.g. India, a toilet is typically included in the bathroom; in others, the toilet is typically given a dedicated room separate from the one allocated for personal hygiene activities. In North American English the word 'bathroom' is sometimes used to refer to any room in a residence that contains a toilet, regardless of the inclusion of a bath or shower.

Historically, bathing was often a collective activity, which took place in public baths. In some countries the shared social aspect of cleansing the body is still important, as for example with sento in Japan and the "Turkish bath" (also known by other names) throughout the Islamic world.

Variations and terminology 

The term for the place used to clean the body varies around the English-speaking world, as does the design of the room itself. A full bathroom is generally understood to contain a bath or shower (or both), a toilet, and a sink. An en suite bathroom or en suite shower room is attached to, and only accessible from, a bedroom. A family bathroom, in British estate agent terminology, is a full bathroom not attached to a bedroom, but with its door opening onto a corridor. A Jack and Jill bathroom (or connected bathroom) is situated between and usually shared by the occupants of two separate bedrooms. It may also have two wash basins. A wetroom is a waterproof room usually equipped with a shower; it is designed to eliminate moisture damage and is compatible with underfloor heating systems.

In the United States, there is a lack of a single definition. This commonly results in discrepancies between advertised and actual number of baths in real estate listings. Bathrooms are generally categorized as "master bathroom", containing a shower and a bathtub that is adjoining to the largest bedroom; a "full bathroom" (or "full bath"), containing four plumbing fixtures: a toilet and sink, and either a bathtub with a shower, or a bathtub and a separate shower stall; "half bath" (or "powder room") containing just a toilet and sink; and "3/4 bath" containing toilet, sink, and shower, although the terms vary from market to market. In some U.S. markets, a toilet, sink, and shower are considered a "full bath." In addition, there is the use of the word "bathroom" to describe a room containing a toilet and a basin, and nothing else.

In Canada, "washroom" is a frequently used term to refer to such a room, though "bathroom" is also sometimes used.

Design considerations

Towels
Bathrooms often have one or more towel bars or towel rings for hanging towels.

Furniture 

Some bathrooms contain a bathroom cabinet for personal hygiene products and medicines, and drawers or shelves (sometimes in column form) for storing towels and other items.

Bidet

Some bathrooms contain a bidet, which might be placed next to a toilet.

Plumbing
The design of a bathroom must account for the use of both hot and cold water, in significant quantities, for cleaning the body. The water is also used for moving solid and liquid human waste to a sewer or septic tank. Water may be splashed on the walls and floor, and hot humid air may cause condensation on cold surfaces. From a decorating point of view the bathroom presents a challenge. Ceiling, wall and floor materials and coverings should be impervious to water and readily and easily cleaned. The use of ceramic or glass, as well as smooth plastic materials, is common in bathrooms for their ease of cleaning. Such surfaces are often cold to the touch, however, and so water-resistant bath mats or even bathroom carpets may be used on the floor to make the room more comfortable. Alternatively, the floor may be heated, possibly by strategically placing resistive electric mats under floor tile or radiant hot water tubing close to the underside of the floor surface.

Electricity
Electrical appliances, such as lights, heaters, and heated towel rails, generally need to be installed as fixtures, with permanent connections rather than plugs and sockets.  This minimizes the risk of electric shock. Ground-fault circuit interrupter electrical sockets can reduce the risk of electric shock, and are required for bathroom socket installation by electrical and building codes in the United States and Canada. In some countries, such as the United Kingdom, only special sockets suitable for electric shavers and electric toothbrushes are permitted in bathrooms, and are labelled as such.

UK building regulations also define what type of electrical fixtures, such as light fittings (i.e. how water-/splash-proof) may be installed in the areas (zones) around and above baths, and showers.

Lighting
Bathroom lighting should be uniform, bright and must minimize glare. For all the activities like shaving, showering, grooming etc. one must ensure equitable lighting across the entire bathroom space. The mirror area should definitely have at least two sources of light at least 1 feet apart to eliminate any shadows on the face. Skin tones and hair color are highlighted with a tinge of yellow light. Ceiling and wall lights must be safe for use in a bathroom (electrical parts need to be splash proof) and therefore must carry appropriate certification such as IP44.

All forms of bathroom lighting should be IP44 rated as safe to use in the bathroom.

History

The first records for the use of baths date back as far as 3000 B.C. At this time water had a strong religious value, being seen as a purifying element for both body and soul, and so it was not uncommon for people to be required to cleanse themselves before entering a sacred area. Baths are recorded as part of a village or town life throughout this period, with a split between steam baths in Europe and America and cold baths in Asia. Communal baths were erected in a distinctly separate area to the living quarters of the village.

Greek and Roman bathing

The Roman attitudes towards bathing are well documented; they built large thermal baths (thermae), marking not only an important social development, but also providing a public source of relaxation and rejuvenation. Here was a place where people could meet to discuss the matters of the day and enjoy entertainment. During this period there was a distinction between private and public baths, with many wealthy families having their own thermal baths in their houses. Despite this they still made use of the public baths, showing the value that they had as a public institution. The strength of the Roman Empire was telling in this respect; imports from throughout the world allowed the Roman citizens to enjoy ointments, incense, combs, and mirrors. The partially reconstructed ruins can still be seen today, for example at Roman Baths (Bath) in Bath, England, then part of Roman Britain.

Not all ancient baths were in the style of the large pools that often come to mind when one imagines the Roman baths; the earliest surviving bathtub dates back to 1700 B.C, and hails from the Palace of Knossos in Crete. What is remarkable about this tub is not only the similarity with the baths of today, but also the way in which the plumbing works surrounding it differ so little from modern models. A more advanced prehistoric (15th century BC and before) system of baths and plumbing is to be found in the excavated town of Akrotiri, on the Aegean island of Santorini (Thera). There, alabaster tubs and other bath fittings were found, along with a sophisticated twin plumbing system to transport hot and cold water separately.  This was probably because of easy access to geothermic hot springs on this volcanic island.

Both the Greeks and the Romans recognized the value of bathing as an important part of their lifestyles. Writers such as Homer had their heroes bathe in warm water so as to regain their strength; it is perhaps notable that the mother of Achilles bathed him in order to gain his invincibility. Palaces have been uncovered throughout Greece with areas that are dedicated to bathing, spaces with ceramic bathtubs, as well as sophisticated drainage systems. Homer uses the word λοετρά, loetrá, "baths", later λουτρά, loutrá, from the verb λούειν, loúein, to bathe.  The same root finds an even earlier attestation on Linear B tablets, in the name of the River Lousios ("bathing" [river]), in Arcadia.  Public baths are mentioned by the comedian Aristophanes as βαλανεία, balaneía (sing.: βαλανείον, balaneíon, Latinized as balneum, a "balneary").

More recently
Throughout the 16th, 17th, and 18th centuries, the use of public baths declined gradually in the west, and private spaces were favoured, thus laying the foundations for the bathroom, as it was to become, in the 20th century. However, increased urbanization led to the creation of more baths and wash houses in Britain.

In Japan shared bathing in sento and onsen (spas) still exists, the latter being very popular.

Cultural historian Barbara Penner has written of the ambiguous nature of bathrooms as both the most private space and one most connected to the wider outside world.

Gallery

See also
 Accessible toilet
 Folding screen
 Furo - Japanese bathroom
 Washstand

References

Further reading

External links 
 

Rooms
Bathing